Ja Song-nam (born 28 March 1954) is a North Korean diplomat. Ja was North Korea's Permanent Representative to the United Nations between February 2014 and 2018. Between 2006 and 2011, he served as North Korean Ambassador to the United Kingdom.

Early life and career
Ja Song-nam was born on 28 March 1954.

Ja graduated from the Pyongyang University of Foreign Studies in 1983. He then served as the Director-General of the Department for National Reunification Affairs and Director of the Institute for Disarmament and Peace of the Foreign Ministry of North Korea from 2005 to 2006.  He was a Senior Researcher in the Ministry from 2004 to 2005. He was a Counsellor at his country's Permanent Mission to the United Nations in New York from 2000 to 2004. Between 2006 and 2011, he served as North Korean Ambassador to the United Kingdom.

Ja became North Korea's Permanent Representative to the United Nations in February 2014, replacing Sin Son-ho.

Personal life
Ja is married and has children.

References

|-

North Korean diplomats
1954 births
Living people
Permanent Representatives of North Korea to the United Nations
People from South Pyongan
Ambassadors of North Korea to the United Kingdom
Yoyang Ja clan